E Fund Management is a Chinese asset management company founded in 2001. It is considered the largest asset management company in China.

History 
The company was established in April 17, 2001. The initial shareholders were GF Securities, Guangdong Yuecai Trust, Guangdong Securities (liquidated in 2005), Chongqing International Trust, Tianjin Trust and Northern International Trust. 

In 2004, the Midea Group acquired the company's shares from Tianjin Trust and Northern International Trust and in 2005, increased its ownership to 25% after acquiring Guangdong Securities' stake. In 2007, the Midea group transferred its entire stake in the company to the Infore Group. He Jianfeng (son of Midea Group founder He Xiangjian) is considered to be the owner of the Infore Group.

In 2008, the company established a Hong Kong Subsidiary named E Fund Management (Hong Kong) Co., Limited.

References

External links 
Corporate website

Financial services companies of China
Financial services companies established in 2001
Investment management companies of China